Zorayda Sanchez (June 28, 1951 – August 27, 2008) was a Filipino comedian, actress, television and film scriptwriter.

Personal life
She was a single mom with one daughter, Alexis Joyce whom she had with actor Dax Rivera.

Education
She graduated cum laude from the University of Santo Tomas with a degree in Journalism.

Career
Sanchez was a regular fixture of comedy films in the '80s. She was also cast on the 80's hit gag show Goin' Bananas, together with Christopher de Leon, Edgar Mortiz, and the late actors Johnny Delgado and Jay Ilagan.

Filmography

Film

Death
Zorayda Sanchez died of breast cancer on August 27, 2008. She was 57. She was buried in Angono, Rizal.

References

External links

1951 births
2008 deaths
20th-century comedians
20th-century journalists
Actresses from Rizal
Deaths from breast cancer
Deaths from cancer in the Philippines
Filipino journalists
Filipino women comedians
University of Santo Tomas alumni